The North Down by-election of 1898 was held on 7 September 1898.  The by-election was held due to the death of the incumbent Irish Unionist Alliance MP, Thomas Waring.  It was won by the Irish Unionist Alliance candidate John Blakiston-Houston, who unusually, beat another Irish Unionist Alliance candidate, Thomas Corbett.

Result

External links 
A Vision Of Britain Through Time

References

1898 elections in the United Kingdom
By-elections to the Parliament of the United Kingdom in County Down constituencies
19th century in County Down
1898 elections in Ireland